Phyllodiaptomus is a genus of crustacean in the family Diaptomidae. It includes the following species:
Phyllodiaptomus annae (Apstein, 1907)
Phyllodiaptomus blanci (Guerne & Richard, 1896)
Phyllodiaptomus christineae Dumont, Reddy & Sanoamuang, 1996
Phyllodiaptomus irakiensis Khalaf, 2008
Phyllodiaptomus javanus (Grochmalicki, 1915)
Phyllodiaptomus longipes Kiefer, 1965
Phyllodiaptomus praedictus Dumont & Reddy, 1994
Phyllodiaptomus sasikumari Reddy & Venkateswarlu, 1989
Phyllodiaptomus surinensis Orsri & Weera, 2001
Phyllodiaptomus thailandicus Sanoamuang & Teeramaethee, 2006
Phyllodiaptomus tunguidus Shen & Tai, 1964
Phyllodiaptomus wellekensae Dumont & Reddy, 1993
P. wellekensae is an Indian endemic species which is listed as a vulnerable species on the IUCN Red List.

References

Diaptomidae
Taxonomy articles created by Polbot